The Elliott Bridge, in North Dakota, United States, also known as Souris River Bridge, was built by Fargo Bridge & Iron Co. in 1902. The bridge "was designed to replace a county-owned ferry boat that had been operating across the Souris River at 'the Elliott Place.'" It was listed on the National Register of Historic Places in 1997. It is owned and maintained by McHenry County.

See also 
Eastwood Park Bridge: NRHP-listed Souris River crossing in Minot, North Dakota
Westgaard Bridge: NRHP listed Souris River crossing also in McHenry County, North Dakota

References

Road bridges on the National Register of Historic Places in North Dakota
Bridges completed in 1902
National Register of Historic Places in McHenry County, North Dakota
Pratt truss bridges in the United States
1902 establishments in North Dakota
Transportation in McHenry County, North Dakota
Souris River